Frances Lake is a lake of Yukon, Canada. It is the largest lake in Southeast Yukon. Several rivers and creeks flow into Frances Lake, forming extensive deltas. The lake and surrounding area was featured in Anton Money's 1975 autobiographical book This Was the North and one of the creeks is named Money Creek after this early settler to the area.

See also
List of lakes in Yukon

References
 National Resources Canada
 Frances Lake on Sights and Sites of Canada
 

Lakes of Yukon
Hudson's Bay Company trading posts